Taekwondo competitions at the 2015 Pan American Games in Toronto was held from July 19 to 22 at the Hershey Centre (Mississauga Sports Centre) in Mississauga. Due to naming rights the arena will be known as the latter for the duration of the games. A total of eight taekwondo events were held: four each for men and women.

Competition schedule

The following is the competition schedule for the taekwondo competitions:

Medal table

Medalists

The following is the list of medallists per event.

Men's events

Women's events

Participating nations
A total of 28 nations qualified athletes. The number of athletes a nation entered is in parentheses beside the name of the country.

Qualification

A total of 109 taekwondo athletes will qualify to compete at the games. The top twelve athletes, along with the host nation per weight category, excluding the women's +67 kg (which will qualify only 8 athletes) will qualify at qualification tournament in March 2015. A further nine wildcards (five male, four female) will be distributed by the Pan American Taekwondo Union, to countries which did not qualify any athletes at the qualification tournament.

References

 
Events at the 2015 Pan American Games
Pan American Games
2015